The Frank A. Tracy Generating Station is a 12 unit  gas-fired power station located in Storey County, Nevada and owned by NV Energy, serving Reno and the Tahoe Reno Industrial Center. Some peaking capacity is provided by diesel powered units. It lies just east of the Patrick area, about 17 miles east of Reno, just off Interstate 80, between Exit 28 and Exit 32. It is situated on the south bank of the Truckee River, which forms the county line between Storey County and Washoe County on the other side of the river.

Units
Peaking Unit 1 -  peaking, diesel 1961
Peaking Unit - 2  peaking, diesel 1963
Peaking Unit - 3  diesel or natural gas 1994
Peaking Unit - 4  peaking, diesel or natural gas 1994
Unit 1  1963 (units 3, 4 and 5 produce a total of )
Unit - 2  1965
Unit - 3  1974
Unit - 4  1996 6FA combustion turbines
Unit - 5  1996 6FA combustion turbines
Unit - 8  2008 7FA combustion turbines (units 8, 9 and 10 produce a combined 
Unit 9 -  2008 7FA combustion turbines
Unit 10 - 2008

Notes

Energy infrastructure completed in 1961
Energy infrastructure completed in 1963
Energy infrastructure completed in 1965
Energy infrastructure completed in 1974
Energy infrastructure completed in 1994
Energy infrastructure completed in 1996
Energy infrastructure completed in 2008
Buildings and structures in Storey County, Nevada
Natural gas-fired power stations in Nevada
Oil-fired power stations in Nevada